Andrey Hakimovich Abduvaliyev (born 30 June 1966) is a former Soviet, Tajikistani, and Uzbekistani hammer thrower.

He won a gold medal at the 1992 Summer Olympics while representing the Unified Team. After competing for USSR he chose to represent Tajikistan when USSR was dissolved. In 1997 he changed his nationality to Uzbekistan, thus becoming one of the very few athletes to compete for three states. His second Olympic participation was in 2000 while representing Uzbekistan.

His personal best was 83.46 m in 1990.

International competitions

References

1966 births
Living people
Athletes from Saint Petersburg
Soviet male hammer throwers
Tajikistani male hammer throwers
Uzbekistani male hammer throwers
Olympic athletes of the Unified Team
Olympic gold medalists for the Unified Team
Olympic athletes of Uzbekistan
Olympic gold medalists in athletics (track and field)
Athletes (track and field) at the 1992 Summer Olympics
Athletes (track and field) at the 2000 Summer Olympics
Medalists at the 1992 Summer Olympics
Asian Games silver medalists for Uzbekistan
Asian Games medalists in athletics (track and field)
Athletes (track and field) at the 1998 Asian Games
Medalists at the 1998 Asian Games
Goodwill Games medalists in athletics
World Athletics Championships athletes for Tajikistan
World Athletics Championships medalists
Soviet Athletics Championships winners
World Athletics Championships winners
Competitors at the 1990 Goodwill Games